Dragon Boy may refer to:

 Dragon Boy (manga), a 1983 manga by Akira Toriyama
 Dragon Boy (novel), a 1993 book by Dick King-Smith